Chilaka is a surname. Notable people with the surname include:

Chibuzor Chilaka (born 1986), Nigerian footballer 
Rajiv Chilaka, Indian animator